Ficus pisocarpa is a banyan fig species in the family Moraceae.  No subspecies are listed in the Catalogue of Life.  The species can be found in southern China, Indo-China and western Malesia including the Philppines.  In Vietnam it may be called đa đậu.

References

External links 
 

pisocarpa
Trees of Vietnam
Flora of Indo-China
Flora of Malesia